The 2018 Virginia Tech Hokies men's soccer team represented Virginia Tech during the 2018 NCAA Division I men's soccer season. It was the 47th season of the university fielding a program.  The Hokies played their home games at Sandra D. Thompson Field in Blacksburg, Virginia.  The Hokies were led by tenth year head coach Mike Brizendine.

Background

The 2017 Virginia Tech men's soccer team finished the season with a 10–10–0 overall record and a 3–5–0 ACC record.  The Hokies were seeded ninth–overall in the 2017 ACC Men's Soccer Tournament.  The Hokies won their first round match up against NC State, but fell to eventual champions Wake Forest in the second round.  The Hokies earned an at-large bid into the 2017 NCAA Division I Men's Soccer Tournament.  Virginia Tech defeated Air Force in the first round, before losing to Michigan State in the second round.

At the end of the season, one Hokie men's soccer player was selected in the 2018 MLS SuperDraft: Ben Lungaard.

Player movement

Players leaving

Players arriving

The Hokies announced the signing of nine players on February 8, 2018.  The Hokies announced two more signings on March 17, 2018.

Squad

Roster

Updated: August 23, 2018

Team management

Source:

Schedule 

Source:

|-
!colspan=7 style=""| Exhibition

|-
!colspan=7 style=""| Regular season

|-
!colspan=7 style=""| ACC Tournament

|-
!colspan=6 style=""| NCAA Tournament

Awards and honors

2019 MLS Super Draft

Virginia Tech did not have any players selected in the 2019 MLS SuperDraft.

Rankings

See also 

 Virginia Tech Hokies men's soccer
 2018 Atlantic Coast Conference men's soccer season
 2018 NCAA Division I men's soccer season

References 

Virginia Tech Hokies men's soccer seasons
Virginia Tech Hokies
Virginia Tech Hokies, Soccer
Virginia Tech Hokies
Virginia Tech